was a Japanese railway company. The company in Miyazaki Prefecture suspended operation of the railway after a typhoon disaster in 2005 and was liquidated in 2009.

Line
The company operated the Takachiho Line connecting Nobeoka Station in Nobeoka, Miyazaki and Takachiho Station in Takachiho, Miyazaki. The government authorization of the railway business was abolished for a half of the line in 2007 and for the remaining half in 2008.

 Distance 50.0 km (31 mi)
 Nobeoka — Makinine 29.1 km (18.1 mi) officially closed on 2007-09-06
 Makimine — Takachiho 20.9 kilometres (13.0 mi) officially closed on 2008-12-28
 Gauge: 
 Stations: 19
 Double-track line: None
 Electrification: None
 Signalling: Simplified automatic

History

Following some extensions, the line reached Takachiho Station on July 22, 1972 and was renamed the Takachiho Line same day.

Freight service ceased in 1974. In 1982 all service was suspended for four months due to typhoon damage.

When the national railway was privatized in 1987, the line belonged to JR Kyushu, which withdrew from the operation of the Takachiho Line and transferred it to Takachiho Railway, a new company established by local funds, on April 28, 1989.

On September 6, 2005, flooding triggered by Typhoon Nabi washed away two bridges on the line, halting all operations. By December, it was clear that no government funding for rebuilding was available. Attempts by local communities to rebuild the railway were unsuccessful. A shareholders' resolution made on January 6, 2009 started the company's liquidation procedures which ended in March 2009 with no distribution to shareholders.

A new company, the Takachiho Amaterasu Railway, was later established. It repurposed a section of the Takachiho Line in Takachiho for tourist services.

Proposed extension
After the line opened in 1972, construction of the 23 km section from Takachiho to the Takamori line continued until 1975, when flooding in the 6500m Takamori tunnel (16 km north of Takachiho) resulted in work being suspended. Construction was formally abandoned in 1980.

Stations

Cars

In 2005 
TR100 (101, 102, 203, 104, 105)
TR200 (201, 202)
TR400 (401, 402)

Following the closure of the line, two truck-style sightseeing cars, TR401 and TR402, were purchased by JR Kyushu upon an offer from Takachiho Railway. They will be refurbished and used on the new Umisachi Yamasachi limited express service on the Nichinan Line from October 2009.

Among ordinary railcars, TR201 was given to Asa Kaigan Railway without compensation. It will go into service in autumn 2009. Other ordinary cars were disused. TR104 and TR105 were given to the town of Hinokage and are preserved at Hinokage-Onsen Station. TR101 and TR202 were given to the town of Takachiho and are preserved at Takachiho Station. Others were scrapped.

Before 2005 
TR300

Current operations
 operates the line between Takachiho and Amanoiwato as a heritage railway.

References

External links
Takachiho Railway official site
Takachiho-Amaterasu Railway Official site
Akaboshi Tamiko (Manga artist, Inside director of Takachiho-Amaterasu Railway) Official site

Rail transport in Miyazaki Prefecture
Defunct railway companies of Japan
Railway companies established in 1989
Railway companies disestablished in 2009
1067 mm gauge railways in Japan
Japanese third-sector railway lines